WJMF-LD, virtual and VHF digital channel 6, is a low-power television station licensed to Jackson, Mississippi, United States. The station is owned by Rainey Radio. WJMF-LD's transmitter is located on Kerr Drive (off US 80) on Jackson's south side. Programming is currently unknown.

History
WJMF-LP was previously an affiliate of Univision, rebroadcasting a satellite feed of KUOK in Oklahoma City, a former sister station under Equity Media Holdings; consequently, WJMF-LP was Univision's sole affiliate in Mississippi, as well as the state's only Spanish-language TV station in general. WJMF even broadcast KUOK station identifications and Oklahoma ads.

It was originally announced that WJMF would become a LAT TV affiliate. However, Equity placed LAT TV on co-owned WJXF-LP instead. (That station would later switch to Equity's Retro Jams network, before closing down in 2010.)

WJMF was sold at auction to Rainey Radio on April 16, 2009; this separated it from KUOK, which was sold to Tyler Media.  The sale closed on July 10, 2009. In early 2011, WJMF-LP was relocated to channel 6, when it was relaunched as an oldies/classic hits-formatted radio station, "EZ 87.7".

In June 2015, a Saturday evening request show was added to the station. The name of its host is Gearshift Gary.

On July 13, 2021, WJMF-LP signed off shortly before midnight. Its format (classic hits) had already moved to WZQK.

The station was licensed for digital operation on January 11, 2022; its call sign was changed to WJMF-LD.

References

External links

Equity Media Holdings
JMF-LD
Television channels and stations established in 1997
1997 establishments in Mississippi
Low-power television stations in the United States